Erewhon Basin is an extensive ice-free area in Antarctica. It forms a basin in the Brown Hills separating the snouts of Foggydog Glacier and Bartrum Glacier from the northern edge of the Darwin Glacier. It was explored by the Victoria University of Wellington Antarctic Expedition), 1962–63, and named from Samuel Butler's novel Erewhon.

References 

Structural basins of Antarctica
Landforms of Oates Land